Rhynchosida is a genus of flowering plants belonging to the family Malvaceae.

Its native range is Arizona to Oklahoma and Mexico, Bolivia to Southern Brazil and Northern Argentina.

Species:

Rhynchosida kearneyi 
Rhynchosida physocalyx

References

Malveae
Malvaceae genera